Zafar Mahmud (4 December 1923 – 29 March 2016) was a Royal Indian Air Force officer during the Second World War, originally stationed in Burma and subsequently stationed in Quetta (in present-day Pakistan) from 1945 to 1947 before the partition of British India. He was sent to England a number of times to train with the Royal Air Force just before and after the war.

After the partition of British India into Pakistan and India Zafar had the responsibility of transporting a number of fighter planes from India to Pakistan under hazardous conditions. During one such transfer flight, his fuel was contaminated by sugar by parties opposed to those transfers and the plane he was flying crashed near the Indian/Pakistani border. While the plane was destroyed he survived with minor injuries, destroyed his Pakistani Air Force uniform to avoid capture by Indian mobs and sneaked across the border to Pakistan.

He continued his military career in the Pakistan Air Force after the establishment of Pakistan. As Pakistan joined the anti-soviet coalition organized by the United States it was provided extensive training facilities by the U.S. Air Force and Zafar spend a number of years in the U.S. as well as with US forces occupying Okinawa in Japan.

Zafar served as Pakistan's Military Attache to Turkey during the Indo-Pakistani War of 1965 and was pivotal in helping Pakistan circumvent a U.S. embargo against arms shipments to Pakistan by working with the Turkish authorities to help supply the Pakistani military with much needed (American made) spare parts and ammunition.

During the Indo-Pakistani War of 1971 he served as Air Secretary for the Pakistan Air Force in charge of all personnel decisions in the service. Following the war he became the Commandant of the PAF Air War College in Karachi (known previously as "The Staff College," Drigh Road).

Zafar represented the Air Force's interests in the Hamood-ur-Rahman commission that was created by the Zulfiqar Ali Bhutto following  Pakistan's war with India in 1971 and the breakup of the country into two entities, Pakistan and Bangladesh.

He was also part of the team that defended Zia-ul-Haq when Zia was investigated for disobeying orders and participating in the operations of Black September in Jordan in 1970. General Muhammad Zia-ul-Haq eventually went on to become the President and Military ruler of Pakistan after a military coup in 1977.

In 1975, Zafar joined the Pakistan foreign service and served as the country's ambassador to Somalia, Poland and Czechoslovakia before retiring in 1985.

He died due to medical complications at the Combined Military Hospital (CMH) in Lahore on Sunday, 20 March 2016 and was buried the same day next to his wife, Najma Mahmud, who died in 1992. Survivors include his son, Shahid Mahmud and his daughter Nevin (Chandi) Ali Riaz (Mahmud) as well as seven grandchildren.

References

Ambassadors of Pakistan to Czechoslovakia
Ambassadors of Pakistan to Poland
Ambassadors of Pakistan to Somalia
1923 births
2016 deaths
Indian Air Force officers
Pakistan Air Force officers
Pakistani military attachés
Indian expatriates in British Burma